The 2008 Chivas USA season was the club's fourth season of existence, and their fourth in Major League Soccer, the top flight of American soccer. The club competed in the MLS's Western Conference, where they finished in first place, in their Conference, qualifying for the Playoffs for the second time.

Season review

Transfers

In

Out

Roster

North American SuperLiga

Competitions

MLS

League table

Results summary

Results

MLS Cup Playoffs

CONCACAF Champions League

U.S. Open Cup

Statistics

Appearances and goals

|-
|colspan="14"|Players away from Chivas USA on loan:
|-
|colspan="14"|Players who left Chivas USA during the season:

|}

Goal scorers

Disciplinary Record

References

External links 
2008 Schedule

Chivas USA seasons
Chivas USA
Chivas USA
Chivas USA